Corkerhill railway station serves the Corkerhill and Mosspark neighbourhoods of Glasgow, Scotland.

The station was originally a staff halt on the Glasgow and South Western Railway, with a small network of houses having been built for workers at the Corkerhill Carriage Servicing Maintenance Depot (opened 1896); eventually the isolated village was swallowed up by the expanding Glasgow urban area with the construction of the Mosspark, Cardonald and Pollok estates. The station was opened to the public in 1923 and was rebuilt by British Railways in 1954.

Services

1967 to 1983 
Some peak hour services to/from Paisley Canal and the Ayrshire Coast were also provided.

From 1990 
Currently (2016) there is an hourly service in each direction on Sundays.

References

Sources 
 
 

Railway stations in Glasgow
SPT railway stations
Railway stations in Great Britain opened in 1896
Railway stations in Great Britain opened in 1924
Railway stations in Great Britain closed in 1983
Railway stations in Great Britain opened in 1990
Reopened railway stations in Great Britain
Railway stations served by ScotRail
Former Glasgow and South Western Railway stations